Banu Zayd is a Najdi tribe that traces its roots to Zayd who settled Shaqraa in Najd.

Notable people
Among the tribe's members are:

 Muhammad bin Abdul Karim Al-Issa, Saudi politician and Secretary General of the Muslim World League
 Saleh Abdul Aziz Al Rajhi, Saudi businessman, philanthropist, and one of the founders of Al-Rajhi Bank with his brothers
 Saud Al-Shuraim, One of the imams and preachers of the al-Masjid al-Haram
 Bakr Abu Zayd, Saudi Muslim scholar
 Abdullah ibn Jibreen, Saudi Islamic jurist

See also
Tribes of Arabia
Bani Zeid, Palestinian town in the Ramallah and al-Bireh Governorate

References

Tribes of Arabia